were Japanese hereditary noble titles. Their use traces back to ancient times when they began to be used as titles signifying a family's political and social status.

History 
As the national unification by the Yamato imperial court progressed, a kabane was given to the most powerful families by the imperial court, which gradually became a hereditary noble title. During the ancient times, new kabane were made and there were almost thirty of them.

The descendants of the Imperial family were given Omi and the descendants of gods were given Muraji, and out of these, the most influential families were given Ōomi and Ōmuraji. During the Taika Reform, these were however abolished, and the kabane was no longer tied to a specific occupation or political position, but simply began to signify a family's aristocratic lineage and social status. In 684, the traditional kabane system was reformed into an eight-kabane system consisting of Mahito, Ason, Sukune, Imiki, Michinoshi, Omi, Muraji, Inagi.

The imperial House of Yamato became the most powerful family in the kabane system, although during the 6th century AD, a number of other leaders, often with high ranks of Omi and Muraji, sometimes overshadowed the Yamato rulers. This power dynamic became one of the incentives of the Taika Reform.

At first, the kabane were administered by individual clans, but eventually they came to be controlled by the Yamato court. The powerful Omi of the time were given the kabane of Ason, which ranked second under the new system, while most of the Muraji were given the kabane of Sukune, which ranked third. Later, as the clans began to devolve into individual households, the kabane system gradually faded from use.

Name 
It is generally believed that the name kabane (姓) either derived from the word "agamena" (崇名), or alternatively from the word "kyöröi" (骨), meaning "family" in Old Korean.

References 

 Hane, Mikiso; Perez, Louis G. (2014). Premodern Japan: a Historical Survey. (Second edition ed.). Boulder, CO. .

Ancient Japan
Japanese historical terms
Asuka period
Kofun period
Titles